Jade Pennock (born 8 January 1993) is an English professional footballer who plays for FA Women's Super League club Birmingham City. She plays as a winger, attacking midfielder and, occasionally, as a striker.

She is the top scorer and highest assist creator of Sheffield United's Championship history. Pennock has also previously represented Leeds and Doncaster Belles.

Career

Youth and college 
Pennock began her youth career at Leeds in 2001; she won the County Cup in 2009 and was nominated Managers Player of the Year.

Was named as 'freshman of the year' whilst at the University of Montevallo.

After initially attending the University of Montevallo, she transferred to the University of North Georgia for her senior year in 2015, going on to have one of the most decorated seasons in the university's history. Pennock was selected for the PBC All-Tournament All-Stars team, and received All-American honours from the NSCAA.

Pennock was named captain whilst playing for the UNG and was only the fourth ever player in the university's history to be named on the All-American honours team in 2015.

Doncaster Belles 
In summer 2017, Pennock moved to Doncaster Belles from Harrogate Town where she then won the WSL2 championship.

Pennock scored the goal that sealed the title for Doncaster Belles in a 1–0 victory over Millwall with one game left in the league.

Sheffield United 
Pennock signed for Sheffield United on 26 July 2018.

In 2019, Pennock was announced as Sheffield United's Player of the Year, Player's Player of the Year and Manager's Player of the year.

After scoring a hat-trick against Crystal Palace and then a follow up goal in a cameo against Charlton in 2019, The Telegraph & Yahoo Sports reported that Pennock had a goal scoring ratio of one goal to every 62.1 minutes that season, having scored 14 goals in her last 13 appearances.

In October 2019, she combined her football career with a job working as a coach at the YMCA, meaning she only attended 2 out of the 3 nightly training sessions run by the club each week.

After Sheffield United joined the second tier of English women's football, Pennock became their top goal-scorer and assist maker of that era.

In 2019 Pennock scored a 94th minute winning goal against Women's Super League team Liverpool in what was labelled a "shock" 3–2 victory for Sheffield in the Continental Cup.

Pennock signed a one-year contract extension with Sheffield United, ahead of the 2020–21 FA Women's Championship season.

Pennock scored the first ever goal of Neil Redfern’s tenure as Sheffield United manager in 2020 as she scored twice against Championship opponents London City Lionesses.

On 24 May 2021, Pennock confirmed she would be leaving Sheffield United after three seasons.

Birmingham City 
On 17 July 2021, Pennock signed for Birmingham City, in the Women's Super League, making her the first signing under new manager Scott Booth.

Pennock scored her first goal for Birmingham in her third appearance for the team during a WSL fixture against Everton.

On 1 January 2022, Pennock played the whole 90 minutes of Birmingham's 2–0 win over then, Women's Super League leaders Arsenal. The victory was branded as the biggest WSL upset in its history and Pennock was subsequently selected for the Her Football Hub WSL team of the week.

Pennock's goal for Birmingham against Reading in the FA Women's Super League was nominated for the WSL goal of the month and saw her performance noted in the team of the week, chosen by Siobhan Chamberlain.

Personal life 
Pennock acts as an ambassador alongside Manchester United player and England international Leah Galton for SRUSA, a scholarship programme that assists young footballers find places in universities in the United States.

In early 2021, Pennock starred in the television women's football documentary mini-series Throw in the Kitchen Sink talking about the challenges of players balancing semi-professional football with stable careers.

Honours 
Doncaster Belles
 Women's Super League 2 Winners: 2017-18

Individual
 All-American All Star Team NSCAA: 2015
 FA Women's Championship Player of the Month: October 2019
Sheffield United Player of the Year: 2019

References

External links 

 

1993 births
Living people
Sportspeople from Pontefract
Footballers from West Yorkshire
English women's footballers
Women's association football midfielders
Women's association football wingers
Women's association football forwards
Women's Championship (England) teams
Doncaster Rovers Belles L.F.C. players
Sheffield United W.F.C. players
College women's soccer players in the United States
Montevallo Falcons athletes
University of North Georgia alumni